The 2020–21 UEFA Futsal Champions League was the 35th edition of Europe's premier club futsal tournament, and the 20th edition organized by UEFA. It was also the third edition since the tournament was rebranded from "UEFA Futsal Cup" to "UEFA Futsal Champions League".

The final tournament was held at Krešimir Ćosić Hall in Zadar, Croatia from 28 April to 3 May 2021, and was the first time that the final tournament was held at a neutral venue instead of in the country of one of the qualified teams. It was originally set to be held at the Minsk Arena in Minsk, Belarus, which was originally appointed to host the 2020 final tournament. However, on 17 June 2020, the UEFA Executive Committee chose to relocate the 2020 finals to Palau Blaugrana in Barcelona, Spain due to the COVID-19 pandemic in Europe, and Minsk instead hosted the 2021 finals. On 23 February 2021, the UEFA Executive Committee chose to relocate the 2021 finals to the Arena Zagreb in Zagreb, Croatia due to travel restrictions imposed by the COVID-19 pandemic in Europe. On 7 April 2021, the finals were once again relocated, this time to the Krešimir Ćosić Hall in Zadar, after the request of Croatian national health authorities to use the Arena Zagreb.

Due to the COVID-19 pandemic in Europe, the format of the competition was changed, with all qualifying matches played as single leg matches, and the final tournament consisting of eight instead of four teams.

Sporting CP defeated title holders Barcelona in the final to win their second title.

Association team allocation
The association ranking based on the UEFA futsal national team coefficients is used to determine the number of participating teams for each association:
The top three-ranked associations can enter two teams.
The winners of the 2019–20 UEFA Futsal Champions League qualify automatically, and thus their association can also enter a second team. If they are from the top three-ranked associations, the fourth-ranked association can also enter two teams.
All other associations can enter one team (the winners of their regular top domestic futsal league, or in special circumstances, the runners-up).

For this season, the top three-ranked associations, Spain, Portugal and Russia, can enter two teams. As the title holders are from Spain, the fourth-ranked association, Kazakhstan, can also enter two teams.

Distribution
Teams are ranked according to their UEFA futsal club coefficients, computed based on results of the last three seasons, to decide on the round they enter, as well as their seeding in draws.

The following is the access list for this season under the revised format.

Teams
In early April 2020, UEFA announced that due to the COVID-19 pandemic, the deadline for entering the tournament had been postponed until further notice.

A total of 55 teams from 51 of the 55 UEFA member associations participate in the 2020–21 UEFA Futsal Champions League. The title holders and the eight teams with the highest UEFA futsal club coefficients receive byes to the round of 32, and the other 46 teams enter the preliminary round.

All teams in italics are declared champions or selected to play by the national association following an abandoned season due to the COVID-19 pandemic in Europe, and are subject to approval by UEFA as per the guidelines for entry to European competitions in response to the COVID-19 pandemic.

Legend
TH: Title holders

Notes

Schedule
The schedule of the competition is as follows (all draws are held at the UEFA headquarters in Nyon, Switzerland, unless stated otherwise). The tournament would have originally started in August 2020, but were initially delayed to October due to the COVID-19 pandemic in Europe. However, due to the continuing pandemic in Europe, UEFA announced a new format and schedule on 16 September 2020. Instead of mini-tournaments (preliminary round, main round, and elite round), all qualifying rounds will be played as single leg knockout matches, and the final tournament will consist of eight instead of four teams. All matches are played behind closed doors until further notice.

The schedule of the competition announced in June 2020, under the original format, was as follows (all draws held at the UEFA headquarters in Nyon, Switzerland, unless stated otherwise).

Preliminary round
The draw for the preliminary round was held on 27 October 2020, 13:30 CET.

Seeding
The 46 teams were seeded based on their UEFA futsal club coefficients. Prior to the draw, teams unable to host (indicated by italics below) notified UEFA accordingly, and UEFA divided the teams into six groups containing an equal number of seeded and unseeded teams, which would be drawn separately. First, a seeded team able to host was drawn against an unseeded team unable to host, with the former to be the home team, until all latter teams were drawn. Next, a seeded team unable to host was drawn against an unseeded team able to host, with the latter to be the home team, until all former teams were drawn. Finally, a seeded team able to host was drawn against an unseeded team able to host, with the first team drawn of the two to be the home team.

Summary
The matches were played between 24–29 November 2020.

|}

Matches
Times are CET (UTC+1), as listed by UEFA (local times, if different, are in parentheses).

Round of 32
The draw for the round of 32 was held on 9 December 2020, 14:00 CET.

Seeding
The 32 teams, including the nine teams which received a bye (indicated by bold below) and the 23 winners of the preliminary round, were seeded based on their UEFA futsal club coefficients (the title holders were automatically seeded first). Prior to the draw, teams unable to host (indicated by italics below) notified UEFA accordingly, and UEFA divided the teams into four groups containing an equal number of seeded and unseeded teams, which would be drawn separately. First, a seeded team able to host was drawn against an unseeded team unable to host, with the former to be the home team, until all latter teams were drawn. Next, a seeded team unable to host was drawn against an unseeded team able to host, with the latter to be the home team, until all former teams were drawn. Finally, a seeded team able to host was drawn against an unseeded team able to host, with the first team drawn of the two to be the home team.

Summary
The matches were played on 15 and 16 January 2021.

|}

Matches
Times are CET (UTC+1), as listed by UEFA (local times, if different, are in parentheses).

Round of 16
The draw for the round of 16 was held on 21 January 2021, 14:00 CET.

Seeding
The 16 winners of the round of 32 were seeded based on their UEFA futsal club coefficients (the title holders, should they qualify, were automatically seeded first). A seeded team was drawn against an unseeded team, with the first team drawn of the two to be the home team. Based on political restrictions, teams from Russia and Ukraine could not be drawn against each other.

Summary
The matches were played on 18, 19 and 20 February 2021.

|}

Matches
Times are CET (UTC+1), as listed by UEFA (local times, if different, are in parentheses).

Final tournament
The eight winners of the round of 16 played in the final tournament, which consisted of the quarter-finals, semi-finals and final (with no third place match unlike previous tournaments), between 28 April and 3 May 2021, at the Krešimir Ćosić Hall in Zadar, Croatia.

Seeding
The eight teams were seeded 1–8 based on their UEFA futsal club coefficients (the title holders were automatically seeded first).

In the following table, finals or final tournaments until 2018 were in the Futsal Cup era, since 2019 were in the UEFA Futsal Champions League era. All appearances in two-legged finals (2003–2006) or final tournaments (2002: eight-team finals, 2007–2020: four-team finals) are counted.

Bracket
The bracket of the final tournament was determined by the seeding, without any draw, as follows (Regulations Articles 14.02, 14.03 and 14.04):

Times are CEST (UTC+2), as listed by UEFA.

Quarter-finals

Semi-finals

Final

Top goalscorers

Notes

References

External links

UEFA Futsal Champions League Matches: 2020–21, UEFA.com

2020–21
Champions League
Sports events postponed due to the COVID-19 pandemic
November 2020 sports events in Europe
January 2021 sports events in Europe
February 2021 sports events in Europe
April 2021 sports events in Croatia
May 2021 sports events in Croatia